Giant grasshopper can refer to:

 The giant South American grasshopper, Tropidacris violaceus
 The Australian giant grasshopper,  Valanga irregularis
 The beam engine at Shore Road Pumping Station, Birkenhead

Animal common name disambiguation pages